Jozef Smits (born 28 March 1930) is a Belgian water polo player. He competed at the 1952 Summer Olympics and the 1960 Summer Olympics.

References

1930 births
Living people
Belgian male water polo players
Olympic water polo players of Belgium
Water polo players at the 1952 Summer Olympics
Water polo players at the 1960 Summer Olympics
Sportspeople from Antwerp
20th-century Belgian people